The Mainhardt Forest is a hill range up to  in the counties of Schwäbisch Hall and Heilbronn, Hohenlohekreis and Rems-Murr-Kreis in the German state of Baden-Württemberg. It is named after the municipality of Mainhardt that lies at its centre.

Hills 

The highest point of the Mainhardt Forest is the Hohe Brach (586.4 m) between the villages of Erlach and Grab in the municipality of Großerlach. Another hill in the range is the Steinknickle (524.9 m) near Wüstenrot. Near Großerlach the treeless kuppe of the Altwald (552.0 m) offers a view far across the Swabian-Franconian Forest. On the forested kuppe of the Flinsberg (also called the Flehnsberg) (534.8 m) near Oberrot are mighty outcrops of flint blocks. In the southeast the Mainhardt Forest runs between the valleys of the Rot and Kocher in a ridge called the Kirgel (459.4 m), on which there is an observation tower, the Kerner Tower. On its eastern perimeter near Westheim the Steinbühl (484.4 m) rises over the Kocher valley.

References

Literature 
 Egil Pastor: Die Räuber vom Mainhardter Wald: eine Kriminalgeschichte aus dem 18. Jahrhundert. Verlag Haller Tagblatt GmbH, 1986
 Schwäbischer Wald. Merian, 1968
 Fritz Schall: Waldpflege im Mainhardter Wald, in: Naturpark Schwäbisch-Fränkischer Wald. Special edition of the Allgemeine Forst Zeitschrift, No. 41/1980, pp. 1102f

 
Regions of Baden-Württemberg
Mountain and hill ranges of Baden-Württemberg
Forests and woodlands of Baden-Württemberg
Natural regions of the Swabian Keuper-Lias Plains